Parliamentary elections were held in Zaire on 2 November 1975. At the time, the country was a one-party state with the Popular Movement of the Revolution (MPR) as the only legally permitted party. Voters approved a single list of 244 MPR candidates. Instead of the "costly and complicated" system of casting ballots, the election took place by "acclaim"; candidates were presented at public locations such as stadiums and the audience approved them by cheering.

Results 
Of the 244 elected candidates, 217 were men and 27 were women.

References

Elections in the Democratic Republic of the Congo
1975 in Zaire
Single-candidate elections
One-party elections
Zaire